The Last Hurrah is a board game published in 1988 by Avalon Hill.

Contents
The Last Hurrah is an expansion in which the Allied minor nations are represented in the sixth module for Advanced Squad Leader.

Reception
Ellis Simpson reviewed The Last Hurrah for Games International magazine, and gave it 3 stars out of 5, and stated that "a welcome module for ASL and one which proves Avalon Hill's dedication to the completion of the project."

References

Advanced Squad Leader
Board games introduced in 1988